Aino (sometimes referred to as the Aino Symphony) is a single-movement symphonic poem for male choir and orchestra written in 1885 by the Finnish conductor and composer Robert Kajanus. The piece tells the tragic story of the eponymous heroine from the Kalevala, although the Finnish-language text—Ring, Kantele, Ring!—sung by the male choir at the end of the symphonic poem is not from the literary epic but rather is by an anonymous author. Aino premiered on 28 February 1885 at a concert celebrating the fiftieth anniversary of the Kalevala. 

Kajanus's Aino also retains a degree of historical significance as a catalyst for Jean Sibelius: after hearing the symphonic poem in 1890, he was inspired to attempt his own Kalevala-themed composition, a process that would result two years later in the symphonic work Kullervo (Op. 7; 1892).

History

The Kalevala is a collection of folk poetry compiled by Elias Lönnrot in 1835 (the Old Kalevala) and expanded in 1849. Aino's story occurs in Runos III–V within the First Väinämöinen Cycle. Aino's brother, Joukahainen, challenges Väinämöinen to a battle of songs, knowledge, and blades. Annoyed, the old wizard uses his magic powers to sing Joukahainen into the earth up to his shoulders. To save himself, Joukahainen offers Väinämöinen his sister's hand in marriage, and joyfully the wizard reverses his spell. Rather than submit to this fate, a weeping Aino drowns herself and becomes a water spirit. Unbeknownst to Väinämöinen, she returns as a fish and allows him to hook her; as he attempts to filet his catch, she  wriggles from his hands and reproves him for his stupidity. The grieving Väinämöinen again fishes the waters but he does not find Aino.

Not much is known about Kajanus's compositional process, including why he selected the above Kalevala tragedy as his topic.

Notable performances
To commemorate the semicentennial of the 's first publication, the Finnish Literature Society—under the leadership of its chairman, the Finnish senator G. Z. Yrjö-Koskinen—organized a festival on 28 February 1885. The highlight was the premiere of a new Kalevala-themed composition by Finland's then-leading composer: Robert Kajanus's Aino, a symphonic poem for male chorus and orchestra. Kajanus conducted the Helsinki Orchestral Society (which he had founded in 1882) and an unnamed (likely amateur) choir at the Ceremonial Hall of the Imperial Alexander's University of Finland. For , the music critic  (pen name 'Bis') wrote a favorable—if largely descriptive—review, complimenting the piece as "captivating and beautiful... gripping and elevated all the way to the final chord". At the concert, Kajanus also conducted Kullervo's Funeral March, his 1880 setting of Kullervo's demise in Runo XXXVI, as well as his Finnish Rhapsody in D minor (1881).

A week later, Kajanus and the Orchestral Society repeated Aino—its second performance—on 7 March at Ceremonial Hall; the program also included Berlioz's Symphonie fantastique. On 12 November 1885, Kajanus conducted (likely, again, the Orchestral Society) his symphonic poem at the Student House; the occasion was a charity benefit for the family of the recently-deceased Finnish sculptor . The choice of program was appropriate given that Takanen had died before completing his statue  (terra-cotta sketch, 1874; plaster, 1876; posthumously carved in marble, 1886), which was on display at the soirée.  
  
In the autumn of 1889, Kajanus traveled on sabbatical to Imperial Germany for further instruction in conducting under the renowned German conductor Hans von Bülow. A milestone arrived when on 11 February 1890 he conducted the Berlin Philharmonic in a performance of Aino; the audience reportedly received the piece rapturously. Nevertheless, the German music critic Heinrich Ehrlich provided a caustic review in Berliner Tageblatt, which  republished (in Swedish) on 17 February. While conceding that Kajanus was talented and that the beginning of the symphonic poem had had a charming theme, Ehrlich dismissed the Finn as yet another Wagner imitator, the collective lot of which "cannot even achieve [the master's] coughing an spitting"; he concluded by warning Kajanus to find another path forward.

Influence on Sibelius

For the Berlin performance, Kajanus's junior compatriot, Jean Sibelius—who at the time was in Berlin studying counterpoint  under Albert Becker—was in the audience. In the early 1930s, Sibelius told his biographer  that hearing Kajanus's Aino had been a formative experience in his own artistic development:

Two years later, Sibelius's interest in the Kalevala would result in Kullervo (Op. 7; 1892), the symphonic work for soloists, male chorus, and orchestra that launched Sibelius's career—and thus caused him to supplant Kajanus as Finland's most gifted composer (something Kajanus had prophesied—with a "compound of admiration mingled with an undertone of bitterness"—as early as 29 May 1889 upon hearing Sibelius's String Quartet in A minor, JS 183, at a student concert). Kullervo was the first in a celebrated series of Kalevala-inspired compositions by Sibelius, including: the Lemminkäinen Suite (Op. 22; 1893–96,  1897, 1900, 1939), The Origin of Fire (Op. 32; 1902,  1910), Pohjola's Daughter (Op. 49; 1906), Luonnotar (Op. 70; 1913), and Tapiola (Op. 112; 1926). 

Kajanus's Aino therefore retains a degree of historical significance as a catalyst, although Antony Hodgson probably overstates matters in characterizing the Berlin concert as "[therefore] one of the most important and significant events in Finnish musical history". Indeed, as Glenda Dawn Goss has written, in the late nineteenth century, many members of the Finnish artistic community already believed that "a Finn's highest endeavor was cultural service", and many "undertook the study of folk poetry and music as a patriotic duty". In other words, Kajanus's example was just one part of "larger trends ... a profusion of dramatists, poets, artists, composers, folklorists, and professors who—seeking to invent a national character, much of it through high art—nourished an extraordinary efflorescence in music, literature, and the visual arts".

Moreover, Kajanus's Aino and Sibelius's Kullervo, despite superficial similarities such as the deployment of a unison male chorus, are stylistically dissimilar. Sibelius's biographer Erik Tawaststjerna, for example, has argued that the two pieces are "worlds apart in atmosphere and quality", as the Kajanus is "heavily endowed with Wagnerian chromaticism and ... overtones of Lohengrin", whereas the Sibelius draws upon "the mainstream European masters, the symphonies of Beethoven, Bruckner, Berlioz, and Liszt".  concurs, noting that whereas Aino entails the "uneasy marriage of Central European Romanticism to Finnish topics", Kullervo marks the "emerge[nce of] a true national musical language". Ringbom also notes that Sibelius was "extremely critical" of Aino until Kajanus revised it in 1916, removing some of what Sibelius considered to be its Wagnerian excess.

Recordings
In 1991, Jorma Panula and the Finnish Radio Symphony Orchestra made the world premiere recording of Kajanus's Aino. Writing in the American Record Guide, Kurt Moses noted the Wagnerian touches and characterized the symphonic poem as a "pleasant work, even stirring some of the time"; nevertheless, he thought that Kajanus had failed to adequately capture the subject matter of Aino's story. In 2001, Aino received its second recording, by Osmo Vänskä and the Lahti Symphony Orchestra. Charles Parsons, also of the American Record Guide,   described the all-Kajanus disc as a "veritable orgy of German romanticism... with gleaming glowing tone and excitement". About Aino, he wrote that the choral conclusion "adds to the musical splendor". 

The sortable table below lists all commercially available recordings of Aino:

Notes, references, and sources

Notes

References

Sources

Books

Liner notes
 
 

Journal articles
 
 
 

Newspaper articles (by date)

External links
Score available via Music Finland

Symphonic poems
Classical music in Finland
1885 compositions
Music based on the Kalevala